The Rhenish-Hessian Hills, also called the "Land of the Thousand Hills" (Land der 1000 Hügel), refers to that part of Rhenish Hesse within the German state of Rhineland-Palatinate. It lies within the counties of Alzey-Worms and Mainz-Bingen, and covers the same area as the natural region known as the Rhenish Hesse Tableland and Hill Country (Rheinhessisches Tafel- und Hügelland). It covers an area of around 1,400 km2.

Hills 
The hills and spurs of the Rhenish-Hessian Hills include – with heights in metres (m) above sea level (NHN):
 Kappelberg (357.6 m), in the Vorholz woodlands between Bechenheim, Orbis and Oberwiesen near the border with the Palatinate
 Eichelberg (320.3 m), near Fürfeld
 Kloppberg (293,4 m), near Hochborn and Dittelsheim-Heßloch
 Wartberg (285.2 m), with Alzey Wartberg Tower (275,3), south of Alzey
 Jakobsberg (273.8 m), between Dromersheim, Laurenziberg and Ockenheim, with the Jakobsberg Priory
 Hornberg (273.3 m), near Framersheim
 Napoleonshöhe (271.4 m), near Sprendlingen and Zotzenheim, with subpeak Zotzenheimer Horn (247.5 m)
 Horn (271.0 m), in Rhenish-Hessian Switzerland between Siefersheim and Neu-Bamberg, with subpeak Mühlberg (248.5 m)
 Wißberg (270.2 m), between Gau-Bickelheim and Sankt Johann, with golf course
 Michaelsberg (262.2 m), northwest of Spiesheim
 Teufelsrutsch (ca. 260 m), southwest of Wendelsheim, west of Nack
 Mainzer Berg (249.1 m), southeast of Ingelheim am Rhein and east-northeast of Großwinternheim
 Auf der Muhl (247.5 m), zwischen Mainz-Ebersheim, Nieder-Olm and Zornheim
 Westerberg (247.5 m) with Ingelheim's Bismarck Tower on the Waldeck (ca. 212 m), near Ingelheim am Rhein
 Petersberg (245.6 m), between Gau-Odernheim and Bechtolsheim
 Rochusberg (244.9 m), between Bingen am Rhein and Büdesheim, with the Rochuskapelle and Emperor Frederick Tower (ca. 242 m) and Scharlachkopf (226.9 m)
 Mühlberg (242.9 m), between Mainz-Ebersheim and Nieder-Olm
 Rabenkopf (Rhenish Hesse) (200.4 m), near Wackernheim
 Selzer Berg (237.1 m), between Selzen and Sörgenloch
 Lerchenberg (max. 233,8 m), east-northeastern flank of the Mainzer Berg in Mainz with ZDF transmitter (ca. 205 m)
 Schildberg (209,8 m), near Sulzheim

References

External links 
 Der versteckte "Gipfel-Stein" – Der Kappelberg im Vorholz ist mit 358 Metern der höchste Berg in Rheinhessen, im main-rheiner, vom 17. März 2007
 61 lange Kilometer bis zur Rheinmündung… – Selz ist der längste Bach in Rheinhessen, im main-rheiner, vom 20. Februar 2007

 
Rhenish Hesse
Landscapes of Rhineland-Palatinate